64 Andromedae, abbreviated 64 And, is a single star in the northern constellation of Andromeda. With a spectral type G8III, it is a deep-yellow coloured G-type giant approximately 419 light years from Earth with an apparent magnitude of 5.19. The star is moving closer to the Earth with a heliocentric radial velocity of –13 km/s.

This star is estimated to be 350 million years old with a negligible rotation rate, showing a projected rotational velocity of 0.69 km/s. It has a little more than 3 times the mass of the Sun and has expanded to 16 times the Sun's radius. 64 And is radiating 136 times the luminosity of the Sun from its enlarger photosphere at an effective temperature of 4,944

Position and chosen constellation
As to the faint triangle and context in which the star figures see 63 Andromedae.

References

G-type giants
Andromeda (constellation)
Durchmusterung objects
Andromedae, 64
014770
011220
0694